The 1979 USAC Mini Indy Series season was the third and final full season of the USAC sanctioned Formula Super Vee championship.

Race calendar and results

Final standings

References

Indy Lights seasons
1979 in American motorsport